Yamadonga ( Big Thief or  Thief of Yama) is a 2007 Indian Telugu-language fantasy action comedy film directed by S.S. Rajamouli who co-wrote the film with V. Vijayendra Prasad. It stars N. T. Rama Rao Jr., Mohan Babu, Priyamani, and Mamta Mohandas while Ali and Brahmanandam play supporting roles. The film is produced by Cherry and Urmila Gunnam and presented by Rama Rajamouli under the banner of Visvamithra Creations.

Inspired by the 1977 film Yamagola, the plot follows Raja, a thief who is killed by his rivals. Raja's soul travels to Naraka (hell) to face the trail for his sins by Yama, the Hindu god of death and justice. The film began its production in January 2007 and was made on a budget of 16–18 crore (US$4.3–4.8 million). Filming primarily took place in Hyderabad and Ramoji Film City. The film has music composed by M. M. Keeravani and cinematography by K. K. Senthil Kumar.

Yamadonga was released worldwide on 15 August 2007. Upon release, it received positive reviews from critics, and emerged as a commercial success collecting an estimated 29 crores ($7 million) as distributors' share. The film won four Nandi Awards while Jr. N.T.R. went on to win the Filmfare Award for Best Actor – Telugu. A year later after its success, it was dubbed in Hindi as Lok Parlok. It was also dubbed in Tamil as Vijayan in 2016.

Plot
Raja, an orphan boy, is a thief in Hyderabad. Mahi, a young girl, falls in love with him. Raja manipulates her by gaining her sympathy. She gives him a necklace, which he throws away because it is worthless; however, it always comes back to him. 12 years later, Mahi's family treats her like a slave while they enjoy the money that her grandfather left behind. Mahi waits for her "prince" to come to rescue her. Raja is still a conman, but when he enters into the debt of Dhanalakshmi, a beautiful but not-so-innocent lender, he flees.

Meanwhile, Mahi's family wants Mahi out of the way so that they can inherit all of her money. They hire someone to kill her, only to find out that in the event of Mahi's death, all the money goes to charity. Raja saves Mahi and treats her like a princess, which she waited for from her childhood. Raja made a deal with Mahi's uncles, which goes wrong. They hire a goon to kill Raja, and he kills Raja. Raja reaches Yamaloka. He gets to know that Yama planned his death to take revenge on Raja who once made fun of Yama drunkenly. Raja creates confusion by stealing the Yamapasam, since one in possession of Yamapasam becomes the King of Hell. Raja promises festivals and parties and to make Hell better than Heaven. Yama contests his claim. Narada enters the scene and proposes an election. Both Yama and Raja agree.

Yama, along with Chitragupta, tries to get the Yamapasam, but fail. Raja wins the elections; however, Yama angrily insults him. Raja decides to use the Yamapasam to make Yama a human; however, the plan backfires when Yama ends up with the Yamapasam. After regaining power, Raja flees back to Earth, challenging Yama. Raja finds out about the cruelty that Mahi has suffered and decides to fight back against her cruel family.  Raja steals a whip and thrashes her family with it, forcing them to become servants. Raja gets drunk and insults Yama again. This time, Yama decides that he and Chitragupta will enter Bhulokam (Earth) to avenge his insult. Yama disguises himself as the beautiful Dhanalakshmi, and Chitragupta acts like her father.

Yama successfully manages in separating Raja and Mahi, whose love prevented Yama from interfering. After Mahi's uncles call upon the goons that previously killed Raja, the chief hitman kidnaps Mahi for himself, and hits Raja with his car. Raja is severely injured and falls off a cliff into the temple of Lord Narasimha in Simhachalam. Yama sends the Yamapasam after him to take his life, however the divine power within the temple drives away the Yamapasam. Yama once again changes his form into Dhanalakshmi to lure Raja out, but Raja reveals that he knows Yama in disguise. Raja begs for only half an hour of life only in order to rescue Mahi, and apologizes to Yama for his sins and all he has said and done. Yama realizes his errors, and becomes sympathetic but regretfully informs him that he cannot call back the Yamapasam. Raja fights off his enemies and is close to death, when suddenly, the chain that followed him his whole life was revealed to have been blessed by Lord Narasimha himself, and it saves Raja's life. Raja and Mahi decide to live together and get married.

Cast

 Jr. N.T.R. as Raja / Young Yama Dharma Raja
 Sri Simha as young Raja
 Mohan Babu as  Yama Dharma Raja
 Priyamani as Maheswari aka Mahi
 Mamta Mohandas as Moneylender Dhanalakshmi and Earthly Avatar of Yama Dharma Raja
 Ali as Sathi
 Brahmanandam as Chitragupta
 Khushbu as Yama's wife
 Jaya Prakash Reddy as Maheswari's uncle
 Siva Parvathi as Maheswari's aunt
 Raghubabu as Maheswari's cousin
 Ranganath as Maheswari's grandfather
 Rajiv Kanakala as Indra
 Naresh as Narada
 Narsing Yadav as Guard in Yama's Palace
 Bharani as Varuna Deva 
 MS Narayana
 Narendra Jha as Narayana
 Stunt Silva as a goon
 Rambha (special appearance in song "Nachore")
 Navneet Kaur as Rambha (special appearance in a song "Young Yama")
 Preeti Jhangiani as Urvasi (special appearance in a song "Young Yama")
 Archana Veda as Menaka (special appearance in a song "Young Yama")

Actor Sr. N.T.R. is featured in a cameo appearance as himself using archived footage.

Production
Yamadonga is the third collaboration between S. S. Rajamouli and N. T. Rama Rao Jr. after Student No.1 (2001) and Simhadri (2003). In an interview with Telugucinema.com, Rajamouli revealed that the basic plot  where the hero dies and goes to Yamalokam and comes back to Earth  is inspired by the films Devanthakudu (1960) and Yamagola (1977) which starred Jr NTR's grandfather Sr. N.T.R.. Rajamouli mentioned that apart from the basic plot, Yamadonga has no similarities with earlier films.

The film also features a scene with Jr NTR alongside his grandfather as an acknowledgement of Yamagola. Rajamouli worked along with his father V. Vijayendra Prasad to develop the script. Rajamouli chose veteran actor Mohan Babu to play the role of Yama as he felt Mohan Babu was the "perfect and only choice" for the role. Following the suggestion of Rajamouli, Jr NTR underwent extensive weight loss especially for the film. Actress Priyamani is cast opposite Jr NTR. She slipped while walking on the stones and got her ankle sprained with a minor bleeding injury during shooting.

Principal photography of the film began in January 2007. Scenes related to Naraka (or Yama Loka) were shot at a specially erected set at Ramoji Film City. A few sequences were filmed at Talakona forest in Andhra Pradesh. A song was shot at Golconda Fort in Hyderabad, for which a waterfall was created at the location.

Release
The film was initially planned to release on 9 July 2007, but was ultimately released on 15 August 2007. The Tamil version of the film was released on 29 November 2019 under the title Vijayan. ARK Rajaraja have written the dialogues for the Tamil version.

Home media 
The DVD version of the film was released on 29 February 2008. This DVD release was distributed by Tolly2Holly all around the world, but for India. It is available in 16:9 Anamorphic widescreen, Dolby Digital 5.1 Surround, progressive 24 FPS, widescreen and NTSC format. The film was also dubbed into Hindi language as Lok Parlok, and in Odia as Yamraja.

Reception

Critical response
Oneindia.in described as "The film is a visual treat for all ages and classes. Rajamouli has done an excellent job molding NTR Jr's character in the film much like his grandfather's and also for bringing NTR back on the screen in an animated form. NTR Jr's overall performance and his dialogue delivery are a joy to watch. Mohanbabu playing 'Yama' once again proved to be the versatile actor that he is".

Sify gave an "average" verdict explained "This socio-fantasy film works, thanks to the new look of NTR and enigmatic performance of Mohan Babu. The songs and background score of MM Keeravani, the technical aspects and entertainer quotient in the first half make the film watchable". Jeevi of Idlebrain.com gave 3/5 stars said "First half of the film is entertaining. The second half should have been better. The plus points of the film are Mohan Babu, NTR, sets, cinematography and music. On the flip side, the screenplay of the film is not gripping in second half (after NTR returns to earth). The runtime of the film is pretty lengthy (3.05 hours)".

Box office
Yamadoga was commercial success, earning distributor a share of over 29 crore. The film ran 50-days in 405 centers. It completed a 100-day run in 32 centres and become one of the top Telugu films of 2007 and gave NTR Jr. a massive success after his previous blockbuster Simhadri.

Music
The music was composed by M. M. Keeravani and released by Vel Records.

Awards
 Nandi Awards 2008.
 Best Editor – Kotagiri Venkateswara Rao
 Best Makeup Artist – Nalla Seenu
 Best Costume Designer – Rama Rajamouli
 Nandi Award for Best Special Effects – Kamal Kannan

 Filmfare Awards 2008
 Filmfare Best Actor Award (Telugu) – N. T. Rama Rao Jr.

 CineMAA Awards 2008
 Best Actor – N. T. Rama Rao Jr.

Notes

References

External links
 

2007 films
2000s Telugu-language films
Films scored by M. M. Keeravani
Films directed by S. S. Rajamouli
Indian action comedy films
2007 action comedy films
2000s fantasy comedy films
Indian fantasy action films
Indian religious comedy films
Religious action films
2007 comedy films
2000s fantasy action films
Films shot in Hyderabad, India
Films set in Hyderabad, India
Films shot in Andhra Pradesh
Films shot at Ramoji Film City
Films set in Visakhapatnam
Yama in popular culture